Adele Griffin (born July 29, 1970) is an American fiction author, writing numerous novels for adults, young adults, and kids. Her novels Sons of Liberty and Where I Want to Be were both National Book Award finalists.

Personal life
Adele Griffin was born and raised in Philadelphia, Pennsylvania. She lives with her husband and their two children in Los Angeles, California.

Awards and accolades
 2014 The Unfinished Life of Addison Stone Booklist 100 Best YA Mysteries of the Past 10 Years, YALSA 2015 Best Fiction for Young Adults, Booklist Top Ten Arts Books for Youth, Amazon Best Books 2014: Teen & Young Adult, School Library Journal Best Book 2014, Romantic Times Finalist for Book of the Year
 2013 Loud Awake & Lost Booklist Editor's Choice, YALSA 2014 Best Fiction for Young Adults
 2012 All You Never Wanted
 2011  Tighter: Kirkus Best Book
 2005 Where I Want to Be: National Book Award finalist, Kirkus Best Book, ALA Best Book
 2002 Amandine: Publishers Weekly Best Book, ALA Best Book
 2001 Hannah Divided: Booklist Editor’s Choice
 1998 The Other Shepards: SLJ Best Book, ALA Notable Book and ALA Best Book, Publishers Weekly Best Book
 1997 Sons of Liberty: National Book Award Finalist, ALA Best Book

Works
 The Favor (June 2023)
 The Blackberry Farm series (illustrated by LeUyen Pham)
The Becket List (2019)
All Pets Allowed (2021)
Tell Me No Lies (2018)
Be True to Me (2017)
 The Oodlethunks series (illustrated by Mike Wu)
Oona Finds an Egg (2016)
Steg-O-Normous (2016)
Welcome to Camp Woggle (2017)
 The Unfinished Life of Addison Stone  (2014)
 Loud Awake and Lost  (2013)
 All You Never Wanted (2012)
 Tighter (2011)
 The Julian Game (2010)
 Picture the Dead (2010)
Vampire Island series
V Is for Vampire (2009)
The Knaveheart’s Curse (2008)
Vampire Island (2007)
 My Almost Epic Summer (2006)
 Where I Want to Be (2005)
 Overnight (2004)
 Hannah, Divided (2003)
 Dive (2002)
 Amandine (2000)
 Witch Twins series 
Witch Twins (2001)
Witch Twins at Camp Bliss (2003)
Witch Twins and Melody Malady (2003)
Witch Twins and the Ghost of Glenn Bly (2004)
 The Other Shepards (1998)
 Sons of Liberty (1997)
 Split Just Right (1996)
 Rainy Season (1996)

References

External links 

  
 Meet Adele Griffin - Video - Open Road Media
 

1970 births
20th-century American writers
21st-century American writers
American children's writers
American women children's writers
20th-century pseudonymous writers
21st-century pseudonymous writers
Pseudonymous women writers
Writers from Philadelphia
Living people
20th-century American women
21st-century American women